Olympiacos Football Club are a Greek professional association football club based in Piraeus, Attica, who currently play in the Super League Greece. They have played at their current home ground, Karaiskaki, since their foundation in 1925. Olympiacos entered the E.P.S. Piraeus in their first season, winning the league 3 times in a row 1925–1928.

Olympiacos was founded on March 10, 1925, in the port of Piraeus, when the members of Peiraikos Podosfairikos Omilos (Sport and Football Club of Piraeus) decided, during a historical assembly, to dissolve the two clubs in order to establish a unified new one, with an emblem depicting the profile of an Ancient Olympic Games winner. Notis Kamberos announced the name Olympiacos and Michalis Manouskos completed it to its full name, Olympiacos Syndesmos Filathlon Pireos. The Andrianopoulos brothers, however, were those who significantly raised the reputation of the club and added glory to it. Members of a prosperous family, they made the name of Olympiacos known over Greece. Jimmy, Dinos, Giorgos and Vassilis were the first to play. Leonidas made his appearance later on and played for a short time. The club's offensive line, made up of the five brothers, soon became legendary. Olympiacos immediately caught the attention of locals, back then their fanbase consisted mainly of the working class, with the team filling the Piraeus Velodrome, present day Karaiskakis Stadium and becoming EPSP Champions (Enosi Podosferikon Somation Pireos – Regional Championship in Peiraias) the seasons 1925,1926,1927

In 1926, the Hellenic Football Federation was founded and organized the Panhellenic Championship, the 1927–1928 season, the first national championship, were the regional champions from EPSA league (Athens), EPSP league (Peiraias) and EPSM league (Thessaloniki) compete for the national title through play-offs with Aris FC becoming the first champion. Up to 1958–59 the Panhellenic Championship was organized this way however the following season (1928–29) Olympiacos came to a dispute with the Hellenic Football Federation and did not participate in the championship with Panathinaikos and AEK Athens decided to follow Olympiacos and did the same. During that season they played friendly games with each other and together formed a group called P.O.K.The second Panhellenic Championship took place in 1929–30 and the 3rd found Olympiacos winning the Greek national league title, the 1930–31 season, for the first time in his history. It was going to be a very successful era. Since that time the club's first team has competed in numerous nationally and internationally organised competitions.

All players who have played in 50 or more such matches are listed below. Some players who have played fewer matches are also listed; these are players from the club's early days, when fewer matches were played in a season, and players who fell short of the 50 total but made a significant contribution to the club's history, for instance by setting a club record.

Most Appearances

All Time Top Scorers

Key

Greece

South & North America

Europe

Africa

Asia

 Hwang In-beom 2022–
 Hwang Ui-jo 2022–23
 Karim Ansarifard 2017–18
 Ehsan Hajsafi 2018

Oceania

 Chris Kalantzis 1992–97
 Steve Refenes 1992–96 (the last year on loan)

Notable players
(Panhellenic Championship:period 1925–59)
Lefteris Triantafyllou 
(Alpha Ethniki:period 1959–79)

(Professional Championship:period 1979–2006)

Club captains

Notes
Olympiacos FC Players
 Foreign Players in Greece

External links
Olympiacos CFP Official Website
  Olympiacos
Olympiacos Supporters Official Website
  Ultras:Gate 7
Olympiacos The Eternal Champion – RSSSF Official Website
  Greece: List of Champions 1905–Present

References

 
Olympiacos F.C.
Players
Association football player non-biographical articles